Roger Le Bon (1891–1956) was a French film producer and director. Le Bon co-directed a number of French-language versions of films made by the German studio UFA. In 1932 he co-directed the crime thriller Narcotics.

Selected filmography
 The Girl and the Boy (1931)
 Ronny (1931)
 Narcotics (1932)
 The Beautiful Adventure (1932)
 George and Georgette (1934)
 The Decoy (1935)

References

Bibliography
 Youngkin, Stephen. The Lost One: A Life of Peter Lorre. University Press of Kentucky, 2005.

External links

1891 births
1956 deaths
French film directors
French film producers